Per Brunsvig (1917–1997) was a Norwegian barrister.

He was born in Skien. He was a lawyer, then from 1955 barrister with access to working with Supreme Court cases. In 1973 he took the dr.juris degree with the thesis Konstruksjonsansvar ved bygging av skip, and later chaired the Norwegian Bar Association from 1976 to 1979.

References

1917 births
1997 deaths
People from Skien
20th-century Norwegian lawyers
Norwegian legal scholars